is a Japanese surname. Notable people with the surname include:

, Japanese sport wrestler
, Japanese martial artist and actor
Kensuke Kazama, photographer
Sadao Kazama (born 1940), Greco-Roman wrestler
Shinji Kazama, motorcyclist
Shunsuke Kazama, actor
Yasuyuki Kazama, driver
Yūto Kazama, voice actor

Fictional characters
Akira Kazama, Rival Schools and Project Justice character
Asuka Kazama, Tekken character
Daigo Kazama, Rival Schools and Project Justice character
Kazama Chikage, a character in the  Hakuōki video game series
Kazuki Kazama, Samurai Shodown character
Kenji Kazama, main character in the anime and manga D-Frag
Jin Kazama, Tekken character
Jun Kazama, Tekken character
Shin Kazama, the main character of Area 88
Shinji Kazama, Full Metal Panic! character
Sogetsu Kazama, Samurai Shodown character
Tōru Kazama, Crayon Shin-chan character
Soya Kazama, World Trigger character

Japanese-language surnames